William H. Winter (1819-1879) was an American explorer. He was born in Vigo County, Indiana. He settled in Missouri in 1841. In 1843 he emigrated with Overton Johnson to the Oregon Country, and then (without Johnson) to Alta California. Winter and Johnson published an |account of their journey in 1846 entitled Route across the Rocky Mountains with a Description of Oregon and California. The first six chapters were published in the Oregon Historical Quarterly, volume 7 (1906); the full manuscript was republished by the Princeton University Press (1932), which noted significance of a chapter which had not been published in the OHQ reprint to the historical understanding of the Whitman massacre.

After returning to Indiana in 1845, he remained there until 1849, when he returned to California in the gold rush. He farmed near Mokolumne. He returned to Indiana, and then again to California by way of Texas. He died in 1879. He had five sons.

References 

People from Vigo County, Indiana
People from California
1819 births
1879 deaths
Explorers of Oregon
19th-century explorers